"Hard to Love" is a song by South Korean girl group Blackpink, sung as a solo by member Rosé. It was released on September 16, 2022, as the fifth track on Blackpink's second studio album Born Pink (2022). It is upbeat dance, guitar pop, pop rock and disco track with elements of city-pop, 90's rock and roll and "edgy" pop, the track's lyrics revolve around a protagonist expressing hidden insecurities about their ability to be loved.

"Hard to Love" debuted at number 27 on the Billboard Global 200 and was a top-ten hit in Malaysia, New Zealand, Philippines, Singapore and Vietnam.

Background
In March 2021, Korean-New Zealand singer Rosé released her debut single album, R, accompanied by the lead single "On the Ground". The album debuted at number two on the Gaon Album Chart and became the best-selling album by a female soloist in the chart's history. Meanwhile, "On the Ground" peaked at number one on the Billboard Global 200 and became the highest-charting song by a Korean female soloist on the US Billboard Hot 100.

On July 31, 2022, YG Entertainment officially released the album trailer video on the group's official social media accounts, announcing that the group's new world tour would start in October, following a pre-release single in August and the album itself in September. "Hard To Love" was announced as the fifth track of Born Pink on September 7, 2022, through the group's official social media accounts. The song marks the singer's third solo track since the release of her debut single album in March 2021. Blackpink included the song on the set list of their Born Pink World Tour (2022–23), where Rosé performed it as part of her solo stage.

Lyrics and production 
The lyrics of the song were written by Freddy Wexler and Bianca Atterberry. Wexler conjured "Hard to Love" while he was on a jam session with his friends. He later sent a demo of the song to Teddy Park in June 2022 and was video called by him, Lisa, and Rosé the next day. Over the next month, he would FaceTime with Park and the group, who suggested changes. Wexler explained that he was "intimidated at first", because music is "almost a religious experience for K-pop fans, so there's a pressure to deliver something that is worthy". However, it turned out better than he could have ever imagined: "Generally, it's never as good as it was in your head, [but] this was an exception".  The final version of "Hard to Love" was fully recorded by Blackpink member Rosé at The Black Label in Seoul, South Korea.

"Hard to Love" is an upbeat dance, guitar pop, pop-rock and lite-disco track with elements of 90's rock and roll and "edgy" pop. The city pop-esque is built around a soft piano, funk-inspired guitar, disco handclaps, "glowing" neo-soul keys and "thick" bass groove. In the lyrics, the singer expresses hidden insecurities about their ability to be loved. Rosé tells the female perspective, describing how a woman can "make it feel like heaven" and then end up hurting the lover: "Never meant to cause you a problem/Here I am, yet once again/With the same old story". The song is performed in the key of F major with a tempo of 105 beats per minute in common time.

Commercial performance
"Hard to Love" debuted at number 27 on the Billboard Global 200 and at number 19 on the Billboard Global Excl. US. In South Korea, the song debuted at number 146 and peaked at number 87 on the Circle Digital Chart, and also peaked at number 22 on Billboards South Korea Songs chart. It debuted at number 65 on the ARIA Singles Chart and at number 68 on the Canadian Hot 100, and also reached the top ten in Malaysia, New Zealand, Philippines, Singapore and Vietnam.

Accolades

Credits and personnel 
Credits adopted from Melon and Tida.
 Roseanne Park – vocals, creative director
 Bianca Atterberry – lyricist, composer
 Freddy Wexler – lyricist, composer, music producer
 Max Wolfgang – lyricist, composer
 Teddy Park – lyricist, composer, creative director, executive
 24 – composer, arranger, keyboard 1, music producer
 R. Tee – composer, arranger,  keyboard 2, music producer
 Chloe – chorus
 Janghan Yoon – guitar
 Nohc – electronic piano
 Taeyoon Lee – bass
 Josh Gudwin — mixing engineer, studio personnel

Charts

Weekly charts

Monthly charts

References 

2022 songs
Blackpink songs
Rosé (singer) songs
Disco songs
Pop rock songs
Dance music songs
English-language South Korean songs
Songs written by Freddy Wexler
Songs written by Teddy Park